"I Love You (What Can I Say)" is a song written by Deena Kaye Rose and recorded by American country music artist Jerry Reed. It was released in May 1978 as the third and final single from his album, Sweet Love Feelings. The song reached a peak of number 10 on the U.S. Billboard Hot Country Singles chart and number 7 on the Canadian RPM Country Tracks chart.

Chart performance

Notes

References

1978 singles
Jerry Reed songs
Songs written by Deena Kaye Rose
1978 songs